
Jach'a Quta (Aymara jach'a big, great, quta lake, "great lake", hispanicized spelling Jacha Kkota) is a lake in Bolivia located in the La Paz Department, Pedro Domingo Murillo Province, Achocalla Municipality. It is situated south of El Alto and La Paz near Achocalla. Jach'a Quta is situated at a height of about 3,760 metres (12,340 ft), about 0.67 km long and 0.5 km  at its widest point.

References 

Lakes of La Paz Department (Bolivia)